Max Argyle (born 13 November 1992) is an English rugby union player who plays for Jersey Reds in the Greene King IPA Championship. He plays primarily as a blindside flanker, but has positional flexibility within the back row.

References

External links 
 https://web.archive.org/web/20150709080844/http://www.rotherhamrugby.co.uk/squad/140/max-argyle/

Rotherham Titans players
1992 births
Living people
Rugby union players from Derby
Jersey Reds players
Rugby union flankers